An Sen-za (안선자, born 5 May 1945) is a North Korean speed skater. She competed in the women's 1500 metres at the 1964 Winter Olympics.

References

External links
 

1945 births
Living people
North Korean female speed skaters
Olympic speed skaters of North Korea
Speed skaters at the 1964 Winter Olympics